Miss Peregrine's Home for Peculiar Children is a contemporary fantasy debut novel by American author Ransom Riggs. The story is told through a combination of narrative and a mix of vernacular and found photography from the personal archives of collectors listed by the author.

This young adult book was originally intended to be a picture book featuring photographs Riggs had collected, but on the advice of an editor at Quirk Books, he used the photographs as a guide from which to put together a narrative. Riggs was a collector of photographs, but needed more for his novel. He met Leonard Lightfoot, a well-known collector at the Rose Bowl Flea Market, and was introduced to other collectors. The result was a story about a boy who follows clues from his grandfather's old photographs, tales, and his grandfather's last words which lead him on an adventure that takes him to a large abandoned orphanage on Cairnholm, a fictional Welsh island.

The book has been a New York Times best seller. It reached the  1 spot on the Children's Chapter Books list on April 29, 2012, after being on the list for 45 weeks, remaining there until May 20, when it dropped to the fourth spot on the list. Critics have generally praised the book for creative use of vintage photographs in the sepia style and surrealist form, as well as good characterization and settings.

Plot
As a child, Jacob Magellan Portman has been fascinated with his grandfather Abraham's stories about surviving as a Jew during World War II, running from man-eating monsters, and living with peculiar children in a secret home guarded by "a wise old bird." As Jacob grows older, he begins to doubt the stories until the arrival of his grandfather's death. Blood-strewn, exhausted, and lying in his back garden on the outskirts of Florida Woods, Abraham's last words are a mystery: "...find the bird in the loop on the other side of the old man's grave on September 3, 1940, and tell them what happened." As his grandfather dies, Jacob catches sight of a horrific monster just like the ones described in Abraham's stories. Soon, he starts experiencing trauma and being plagued with nightmares relating to those monsters. Believing their son to be going crazy, Jacob's parents take him to Dr. Golan, a psychiatrist, who suggests that Jacob go to Cairnholm, Wales, the location of his grandfather's children's home to confront the place of his trauma. On his own, Jacob locates and explores the old house only to find it empty and everything caked in dust. According to the local people, the place is haunted and a bomb had killed all its inhabitants many years ago, on September 3, 1940.

Sensing a connection, Jacob refuses to give up and returns to the house one more time, where he encounters a mysterious girl who can conjure fire with her hands whom he follows, trying to question her after hearing her call out his grandfather's name. They reach the bogs surrounding the house before Jacob realizes that the people of Cairnholm are different, including the patrons at the inn and his father isn't there. Luckily, a confused Jacob is rescued by the girl from before and an invisible boy, who introduce themselves as Emma Bloom and Millard Nullings respectively. A suspicious Emma holds him captive and brings him to the children's home, where he finds it magically transformed to the paradise of his grandfather's stories, complete with the peculiar children and the "wise old bird", who is, in fact, the headmistress Miss Alma LeFay Peregrine (named after that well-known raptorial bird of prey the peregrine falcon).

There Jacob is also introduced to other peculiar children apart from Emma and Millard: Bronwyn Bruntley, a girl with incredible strength, Claire Densmore, a little girl with an extra mouth at the back of her head, Olive Abroholos Elephanta, a little girl who can levitate, Enoch O'Connor, a boy who can animate non-living things for a short amount of time by transplanting organs, Hugh Apiston, a boy with bees living in his stomach, Fiona Frauenfeld, a girl with an affinity for growing plants, and Horace Somnusson, a boy with prophetic dreams. Jacob is shocked and befuddled by the state of the place, so Olive and Millard explain that they are currently existing in a time loop, a place where time is constantly reversed and where they all relive the same day every day, September 3, 1940. This is all thanks to Miss Peregrine, a special type of peculiar being known as an ymbryne, one who can shapeshift into birds (namely a peregrine falcon after which she is named) and manipulate time. Apart from keeping them alive (if not the bomb would have killed them), this time loop also protects the peculiar children from being hunted by hollowgast — humanoid, tentacle-mouthed creatures that devour peculiars. That experiment occurred in the Siberian tundra, which was marked by a cataclysmic explosion, and from there the hollowgast were born. In addition to hollowgast being a threat, hollows who have consumed enough peculiars are evolved into wights, beings who resemble humans in every aspect save their eyes, which have no pupils. These wights' ultimate goal is to gain power from the peculiars, as well as morph every one of their fellow hollowgast into wights that will rule the world.

Soon, Miss Peregrine's former mentor Miss Avocet arrives at the loop mad with grief over the kidnapping of her wards to wights, who have executed their plan of raiding loops. Fearing for the children's safety, Jacob is tasked with the job of reporting any suspicious information going on in the outside world. With his comings and goings, Jacob and Emma begin to develop feelings for each other, as well as get a glimpse into his own peculiar self: he can see the hollows while other peculiars can't, just like his grandfather. Miss Peregrine's fears are confirmed when eyeless sheep bodies begin to pile up, and Martin, a worker in the Cairnholm Local Museum, is killed. Going against Miss Peregrine's orders to not leave the house, Enoch, Bronwyn, Emma, Jacob and Millard escape, and Enoch uses a sheep heart to briefly bring Martin back to life. Martin manages to inform the group of the presence of a wight on the island, but by then it is too late as one appears right behind them along with a hollow companion. To Jacob's shock, he reveals himself to be Dr. Golan, as well as Jacob's family's hired lawn gardener, and Jacob's middle school bus driver. Jacob refuses Golan's offer to join him in finding peculiars, and decides to stay with his friends. Golan sends his hollow after the group, and Emma and Jacob split up from the rest. After a brief scuffle, Jacob kills it with a pair of sheep shears. They make their way back to the orphanage, but discover that Golan has kidnapped Miss Peregrine and Miss Avocet and locked the rest of the children in the house.

Dr. Golan warns them not to attempt to rescue Miss Peregrine and leaves the loop, but Millard manages to sneak out invisibly and follow him. Jacob and his friends follow Millard's tracks and find Golan near a lighthouse trying to catch a boat with his other wight comrades. During the process of saving Miss Peregrine, who is trapped in her bird form, Millard is wounded from a gunshot, but Golan is ultimately killed by Jacob. Just then, the other wights arrive and even though they are able to rescue Miss Peregrine, Miss Avocet is taken away. Returning to the orphanage, they find it destroyed, leaving them having to track down the wights and discover how to help Miss Peregrine. It is then Jacob decides to follow his friends and returns to the present to say goodbye to his father, but promises to return when his mission is finished. Guided by only a prophetic dream from Horace, they set sail to find help.

Peculiardom

Peculiars
Otherwise known as syndrigasti (a word meaning "peculiar spirit" in the Old Peculiar language, which is in turn the author's adaptation of Old English, or Anglo-Saxon language), peculiar folk are a branch of humanity possessing a second soul which manifests itself in strange ways such as abnormal characteristics and abilities commonly referred to as peculiarities.  Very rarely are peculiar children born to peculiar parents as the essence or gene of peculiarity often skips entire generations, making peculiar population vastly less than that of normal people.

Ymbrynes
An ymbryne (pronounced IMM-brinn) is a specific kind of female peculiar who can transform into distinct birds, control and manipulate time as she sees fit, and govern the peculiar world. Most essentially, the ability to control time lets these women possess a period of historical time by looping it, creating a potentially eternal sanctuary for peculiars. They often set out into the present-day world to rescue peculiars in dire situations or to search for those without an ymbryne. Ymbryne means "revolution" or "circuit" in Old Peculiar.

Council of Ymbrynes
The Council of Ymbrynes is the official government and law of peculiardom. Their responsibilities include the maintenance of loop order, the writing or amending of laws on a regular basis, and the determination of sentences for those convicted of a crime. Members are not specified.

Time loops
Time loops are the fabric of the peculiar world, often referred to as peculiardom. Similar to towns, cities, states, and countries, they act as specific locations. Together they create a vast and quite complex world of varying whereabouts and dates only peculiars are able to enter. Within these loops, peculiars live indefinitely without aging or reliving previous experiences, even as the day around them repeats itself. While it may appear to be a form of eternal youth, it is the suspension of time inevitable. In reality, many, if not all, of Miss Peregrine's children are over fifty years old, but the loop detains them as teenagers and small children physically and mentally. A loop must be reset daily or it will collapse, leaving all peculiars within it exposed to the outside world.

Aging forward
As a result of time loops, those who reside in them may not be able to return to the present day, depending on how long they've been there.  In a mere matter of hours outside of the loop, the amount of time evaded will catch up.  An example of this is Miss Peregrine's own former ward, a young girl named Charlotte who left the loop while Miss Peregrine was away.  She was discovered by police in the mid-1980s and sent to a welfare agency.  When Miss Peregrine found her just two days later, she'd already aged thirty-five years.  Although she survived the ordeal, the unnatural aging process had caused Charlotte a great deal of mental disorder, and she was sent to live with Miss Nightjar, an ymbryne more suited for her care.  The same process of deterioration applies to anything taken out of time loops as another instance was an apple Jacob took back to the inn where he and his father were staying in the present day. He left it on the nightstand next to his bed as he fell asleep that night, but by morning, found it had rotted to the point of disintegrating.

Hollowgast
A word meaning "empty spirit." The hollowgast are monsters who feed on peculiars. They were created by a freak-accident in an unethical and illegal experiment conducted by Miss Peregrine's two brothers. Hundreds had joined their cause, and with the aid of misguided but powerful ymbrynes, it was intended to achieve immortality without the limitations of time loops. Instead, it led to a catastrophic collapse that destroyed half of Siberia where the experiment took place. Everyone involved was presumed dead, but their corpses became deformed and crawled back to a lesser, animalistic state of life. Apart from their shadows, hollows are invisible to all but a gifted few including Abraham and Jacob Portman. They are also identified by the groups of large tentacle-like tongues that occupy their grotesquely stretched mouths. It is speculated that this outcome was the result of being reverse-aged to a time before their souls existed, thus the word hollowgast. Their souls, having been erased, hollows possess no form of peculiarity, rendering them unable to enter time loops.

Wights
If a hollow consumes enough peculiar souls, its original human form is restored, with the exception of irises and pupils leaving the eyes entirely white.  Because of this, peculiars refer to these evolved creatures as wights.  They possess no extraordinary abilities but are highly skilled in posing as normal people under multiple identities and can even pass into time loops.  Much of their existence revolves around procuring peculiars for remaining hollows to devour. Once they set their eyes on a peculiar child, they will follow them around, as they did with Jacob all the way to the island.

Characters

Peculiar children
Jacob Magellan Portman — A 16-year-old American teenager and the protagonist of the story.  Jacob becomes subject to acute stress reaction after witnessing his grandfather's death and claiming that a monster from his grandfather's childhood stories had killed him.  Everyone he knows begins to consider him crazy and avoids him.  His parents eventually take him to see a psychiatrist, on whose instruction Jacob's dad takes him on a trip to the Welsh island where his grandfather grew up.  There, Jacob discovers that the stories of a magical orphanage and both peculiar children and the monster are real.  He also learns that the ability to see these monsters is actually an extremely rare peculiarity as they are invisible to all but a few like himself.
Abraham Ezra Portman — Abraham was Jacob's grandfather who also had the peculiarity of seeing the monsters.  He left Miss Peregrine's loop as a young man to join both the war against Germany and the war against the hollowgast, promising to make a home in America for his fellow peculiars.  But having started a family of his own during his time in the normal world, he never went back for them.  In spite of this, he was still pressured into eradicating hollows, resulting in long, frequent hunting-trips away from his wife and two children, a secret which they took as careless neglect.  Over the years, Abraham became a near-stranger to everyone he knew and, in his old age, was killed by one of the very monsters he had fought so valiantly to defeat.  Police simply concluded that dementia and an attack by wild animals were the cause of his death.
Emma Bloom — Emma is a teenager under Miss Peregrine's care. Her peculiarity manifested in her hands when she was ten years old.  They began to glow red, becoming painfully hot to the point of generating fire. Emma had a romantic relationship with Abraham which they maintained even as he went to war until he stopped responding to her letters.  After years without replying, Abraham finally wrote her back simply to tell her he could no longer do so because he'd married another woman.  Emma became heartbroken and bitter but still mourned him upon learning of his death when his grandson Jacob arrived in Miss Peregrine's time loop.  Although she treated Jacob harshly at first, their mutual sorrow for Abraham started a deeply sincere relationship between them.
Millard Nullings — Millard is a young adolescent possessing the peculiarity of invisibility which is said to be quite uncommon.  He chooses to go about nude to stay fully invisible, but wears clothes at supper on Miss Peregrine's orders.  He is also exceptionally well-versed in all things peculiar and, as a hobby, spends much of his time documenting every little detail of the day they live in.
Bronwyn Bruntley — A young adolescent possessing super-human strength, Bronwyn is also kindhearted and a loyal friend.  She respects and obeys Miss Peregrine more than her fellow wards do, often correcting them and citing rules they're meant to follow, mostly in fear of anyone getting in trouble.  The only occasions for which she refuses to cooperate are when she is made to dress ladylike.  Before Miss Peregrine took her and her older brother Victor in, Bronwyn discovered her own strength at the age of ten when she snapped their abusive stepfather's neck without actually meaning to.
Enoch O'Connor — A young adolescent with the ability to resurrect the dead and bring inanimate objects to life for a limited time by using the extracted organs of other living things.  Enoch was born to a family of undertakers and, before moving into time loops, caused tremendous confusion by frequently bringing the dead to life at his father's funeral parlor.  He is the least liked of Miss Peregrine's wards as the others are put off by his selfish behavior, negative thinking, and obsession with violence.  His previous ymbryne was never specified, nor were his reasons for relocating to Miss Peregrine's loop.
Olive Abroholos Elephanta — Olive is the second youngest to Claire and comes across as quite giddy and openly friendly. Her peculiarity renders her lighter than air, making her float freely like a balloon.  She has barely any control over it and must always be weighted down or bound to something to keep from floating away.  Her most routine means is a pair of heavy leaden shoes.
Hugh Apiston — Hugh is a teenager with bees living in his stomach.  His peculiarity allows him to communicate with them and command them. He is in love with Fiona.
Horace Somnusson — Horace is a young adolescent capable of having prophetic dreams, albeit very scarcely.  They occur most often as nightmares of events so horrifying, they have a tendency to throw him into bouts of shock.  He can be quite a snob and is an extremely passionate follower of fashion, commonly seen in a suit and tie with a top hat and monocle.
Fiona Frauenfeld — Fiona is a teenager possessing power over plants.  Her peculiarity allows her to manipulate their life and growth and control their movements.  She speaks with a thick Irish accent, though she rarely speaks at all, and has a romantic, symbiotic relationship with Hugh.
Claire Densmore — The youngest of all Miss Peregrine's wards, Claire also possesses the most grotesque peculiarity in their midst: a second mouth in the back of her head with sharp teeth, hidden beneath her blonde curls.  She is typically cheerful but becomes shy and self-conscious when made to dine with others.
Victor Bruntley — Miss Peregrine once had many more peculiars under her care, many of whom were killed by the hollowgast, including Bronwyn's older brother Victor.  Like Bronwyn, Victor possessed immense physical strength.  He left during the loop's early days, claiming he couldn't stand being trapped there; it was a reckless decision which led to his demise.  Until his burial when the loop closed, his lifeless body had remained at Miss Peregrine's home, locked away in his bedroom and neatly laid to rest in bed.  Some of the children would occasionally sneak in and have Enoch resurrect him, though he always seemed to be in a rush to get back to the afterlife.
The Twins — The Twins appear as two short children, wearing sacks on their heads that have holes for the eyes, however without their masks, they have pale gray, scaly skin with gray serpentine eyes and fangs. Not much is known about the Twins’ personalities, besides the fact that they are shy and quiet due to the fact that they do not speak to anyone besides each other. Not too much is known about their peculiarity, but in the movie they were capable of turning a Wight into stone with just a glare, similar to Medusa in Greek Mythology. It was believed in the book they had a telepathic bond.

Ymbrynes
All ymbrynes take on last names which correspond to the type of bird into which they can shapeshift (e.g., Miss Peregrine can turn into a peregrine falcon).

 Alma LeFay Peregrine — Miss Peregrine is a highly skilled ymbryne and the headmistress of her children's-home. She is a delicate woman who enjoys smoking a pipe and adores her charges, though she can be strict at times.  At a very young age, she learned to hone her peculiarity as a student under Miss Avocet.  Miss Peregrine's loop is located on the fictional island of Cairnholm, Wales, on September 3, 1940, though it's actually September 2 for the first few hours.
 Esmerelda Avocet — Miss Avocet is an elderly and wise woman from the mid-Victorian period in England.  Having taught most notable ymbrynes to master their craft, she is regarded as near-royalty.  Her loop is in Derbyshire on July 15, 1867, but it was invaded by wights and hollowgast, forcing her to flee to Miss Peregrine's loop.
 Miss Janet Nightjar — Miss Nightjar takes in difficult cases of peculiars.  One such case being Miss Peregrine's former ward, Charlotte.  Miss Nightjar's loop is in Swansea, Wales on April 3, 1901, and is co-run by Miss Thrush.
 Miss Dawn Finch — Miss Finch  has an aunt who is also an ymbryne but prefers to stay in finch form.  Their loop is based in London, but the date is not stated.
 Millicent Thrush — Miss Thrush has a loop in London and is headmistress of a children's home there but also co-runs Miss Nightjar's special-care home.
 Miss Alice Kestrel — Possibly a rather historical ymbryne.  Enoch mentions an old story of her being injured in a road accident.  The incident is said to have trapped her in the form of a kestrel for an entire week, leading to the collapse of her loop before she healed.  Location and date are not stated.
 Balenciaga Wren — Miss Wren is the headmistress of a menagerie for peculiar animals.  Her loop is based in mainland Wales in a much older, unknown time.
 Miss Bianca Gannett — Miss Gannett has a loop in Ireland, in June 1770.
 Miss Emily Treecreeper — Miss Peregrine mentions her name but doesn't remember where or when her loop is based.

Normals
 Franklin Portman — Jacob's father, Frank, is an unemployed, amateur ornithologist who volunteers at a bird rescue and likes to pass it off as his job.  He also spends much of his time writing manuscripts for nature books, though he's never completed one, giving up on his every project midway.  His whole life, he's had a rather rough relationship with his own father, Abraham, as he was almost never around.  Frank is very protective of his son, but understands his need for room to grow and learn on his own.
 Maryann Portman — Maryann is Jacob's obsessively materialistic mother and Franklin's wife. She comes from a wealthy family that owns a drugstore company with one hundred and fifteen branches across the state of Florida.  While she loves her son and is immensely protective of him, she tends to be more concerned about public image and what people think of them.
Dr. Jeff Golan — Dr. Golan was one of the many peculiars who supported and participated in the disastrous experiment that created the hollowgast.  He is among those who have reached the state of being a wight, a term he disowns as "their word."  He is a licensed psychiatrist and, in order to uncover information on Miss Peregrine's loop, has been stalking the Portman family for years under many a guise including their yard man, Jacob's middle school bus driver Mr. Barron, and ultimately himself when Jacob begins seeing him for therapy.
Malthus — Malthus was once a peculiar and an old friend of Dr. Golan's who also joined the rebellion against the ymbrynes, dying by the results of the experiment designed to overthrow them and reemerging a hollow.  He now travels with the restored Golan, devouring peculiars as they discover time loops.  For reasons not specified, Golan allowed him to kill Abraham before they could learn the location of Miss Peregrine's loop.  From then on, Malthus haunted Jacob, keeping a vigil on him day and night.
Martin Pagett — Martin is a part-time but knowledgeable and well-spoken curator of a small museum on Cairnholm, though due to the island's sparse renown and low tourist appeal, they rarely see any patronage.  He strikes up a bond with Jacob, giving him a rundown of Cairnholm's history and assisting him in learning how the children's home was destroyed.  Martin plays an unwitting but vital role in discovering Malthus and Dr. Golan on the island.
Oggie — Oggie is Martin's uncle, whom he introduces to Jacob in order to help him learn more about the fallen children's home.  Elderly and gruff but still sharp of wit, Oggie recalls the strange children and their reclusive headmistress and recounts the bombing in detail, occasionally veering off into rants on the weather and politics.  Though he longed to fight for his country, he was too young then and merely watched it all take place.
 Susan Portman — Susan is Frank's younger sister and Jacob's aunt.  While going through Abraham's possessions with them after his passing, she found his copy of The Selected Works of Ralph Waldo Emerson and that he had written a brief well-wish to Jacob on the title page.  When she gives it to him on his birthday, Jacob unwittingly discovers a letter from Miss Peregrine when it fell out from between the pages.
Ricky — Ricky is described as Jacob's best and only friend, though their relationship is more of a deal for personal benefit: in exchange for Jacob helping Ricky with his homework, Ricky acts as Jacob's bodyguard at school.

Reception
Miss Peregrine's spent seventy weeks on The New York Times Best Sellers list for children's chapter books. It reached the number one spot on the list on April 29, 2012, after being on the list for forty-five weeks. It remained there until 20 May, when it dropped to the fourth spot on the list. The book dropped off the list on September 9, 2012, after sixty-three weeks.

According to Deborah Netburn for the Los Angeles Times, the best part of the novel is "a series of black-and-white photos sprinkled throughout the book".  Publishers Weekly called the book "an enjoyable, eccentric read distinguished by well-developed characters, a believable Welsh setting, and some very creepy monsters."

Sequels
A sequel, titled Hollow City, was released on January 14, 2014. The novel is set immediately after the first, and sees Jacob and his friends fleeing from Miss Peregrine's to the "peculiar capital of the world", London.

The third installment in the Miss Peregrine's series, titled Library of Souls, was announced in early 2015. It was released on September 22, 2015.

A Map of Days, the first installment of a new trilogy set in the United States and featuring the main protagonists from the original trilogy, was released on October 2, 2018, by Dutton Books for Young Readers (a division of Penguin Group).

On January 14, 2020, the fifth installment, The Conference of the Birds, was released.

On February 23, 2021, the sixth and final book of the second trilogy,  The Desolations of Devil's Acre, was released.

Adaptations

Graphic novel
An original graphic novel adaptation by Cassandra Jean and Ransom Riggs, called Miss Peregrine's Home for Peculiar Children: The Graphic Novel was released in October 2013.

Film

A film adaptation of the book was released in the United States on September 30, 2016. It was directed by Tim Burton from a screenplay by Jane Goldman. Eva Green played Miss Peregrine in the film, along with Asa Butterfield as Jacob, and Ella Purnell as Emma Bloom.

References

External links
 

2011 American novels
2011 children's books
American children's novels
American fantasy novels adapted into films
Dark fantasy novels
Debut fantasy novels
Novels set in Wales
Novels set on islands
Quirk Books books
Ophthalmic conditions emphasizing symbolism
Time loop novels
Novels by Ransom Riggs
2011 debut novels